Dryocosmus rileyi is a species of gall wasp in the family Cynipidae.

References

Cynipidae
Insects described in 1896

Gall-inducing insects
Taxa named by William Harris Ashmead